Aulobaris is a genus of flower weevils in the beetle family Curculionidae, with about eight described species.

Species
 Aulobaris amplexa Casey, 1920
 Aulobaris anthracina (Boheman, 1836)
 Aulobaris dux Casey, 1892
 Aulobaris elongata Green, 1920
 Aulobaris misera Casey, 1920
 Aulobaris naso LeConte, 1876
 Aulobaris pusilla (LeConte, 1869)
 Aulobaris subdita Casey, 1920

References

Further reading

 

Baridinae
Articles created by Qbugbot